The Wild Women of Chastity Gulch is a 1982 American made-for-television Western romantic comedy film directed by Philip Leacock and starring Priscilla Barnes, Lee Horsley, Joan Collins, Donny Osmond, Morgan Brittany and Lisa Whelchel. Executive produced by Aaron Spelling, it premiered on ABC on October 31, 1982, and was later syndicated to cable television for rebroadcast.

Synopsis
In Civil War-era Southern Missouri, Dr. Maggie McCullough travels to the aid of her ailing aunt, Annie, the town's madame, in the lovely community of Sweetwater.  With all of the men away at war, Maggie coordinates a truce between Aunt Annie's girls and the respectable women of the town.  While Maggie contemplates the love triangle that is formed with an injured Union fighter, Frank Isaacs, and a captured Confederate doctor, Captain John Cane, a demented faction of soldiers invade Sweetwater and the women must spring into action to defend their homes.

Cast
Priscilla Barnes ...  Maggie McCulloch 
Lee Horsley ...  Captain John Cain
Joan Collins ...  Annie McCulloch 
Howard Duff ...  Colonel Samuel Isaacs 
Morgan Brittany ...  Lannie 
Donny Osmond ...  Frank Isaacs 
Lisa Whelchel ...  Amy Cole 
Pamela Bellwood ...  Sarah 
Phyllis Davis ...  Sugar Harris 
Jeanette Nolan ...  Gertrude 
Paul Brinegar ...  Bodie 
Dennis Fimple ...  Lamont 
Susan Kellermann ...  Betsy 
Paul Carr ...  Confederate Captain 
Rex Holman ...  Lt. Pritchard 
Rayford Barnes ...  Russell 
Steve Hanks ...  Lt. James 
Tom Clark ...  Matthew 
Robert Rymill ...  Sam 
Jerry J. Lewandowski ...  Tommy 
Scott Arthur Allen ...  Tom Trombitas

See also
 List of television films produced for American Broadcasting Company

References

External links
 

1982 films
1982 television films
1982 romantic comedy films
1980s Western (genre) comedy films
ABC network original films
American Western (genre) comedy films
American romantic comedy films
1980s English-language films
Films set in Missouri
Films directed by Philip Leacock
Films scored by Frank De Vol
1980s American films